Aenetus eugyna is a moth of the family Hepialidae. It is known from New Guinea.

References

Moths described in 1907
Hepialidae